Dream Soldier is the fourth album by British soul singer-songwriter Des'ree. It was released on 31 March 2003 on the Sony Soho Square record label and features the UK top 75 single, "It's Okay". For sixteen years, it was the last studio album by Des'ree as she hadn't released any new material since the album's release before going on hiatus to focus on her interest in naturopathy. It wasn't until 2019 when she announced her fifth studio album, A Love Story, set to be released on October 11 through Stargazer Records. This is also her only studio album to be released in the 2000s as it was her last album before her hiatus.

Commercial reception
The album was a commercial failure in comparison to Des'ree's previous three studio albums, entering and peaking at number 178 in the UK Albums Chart and spending three weeks in the chart. The album failed to chart in the US. Following the commercial and critical failure of Dream Soldier, Des'ree was dropped by her label, Sony Music, and did not return to recording or releasing music until 2019.

Singles
Only one single was released from Dream Soldier due to the poor commercial performance of the album. "It's Okay", which featured a radio mix by Stargate, was released on 24 March 2003 and reached number 69 in the UK Singles Chart. The single didn't chart in the US.

Track listing
Worldwide edition

Credits

Production
 Arranged by Will Malone (tracks: 1 to 5, 8, 9)
 Engineered by Alex Scannell, Simon Changer
 Strings engineered by Alex Scannell (tracks: 2, 4, 8, 9)
 Mastered by Ray Staff
 Mixed by Jonathan Quarmby (tracks: 2 to 11), Kevin Bacon (tracks: 2–11), Stargate (track: 1)
 Producer Des'ree (tracks: 2 to 11), Jonathan Quarmby (tracks: 2–11), Kevin Bacon (tracks: 2–11), Stargate (track: 1)

Personnel
 Backing vocals – Chris Ballin (tracks: 1, 3, 11), Derek Green (tracks: 1, 3, 11), Des'ree (tracks: 1 to 4, 9 to 11)
 Bass – Kevin Bacon (tracks: 1 to 5, 8 to 10)
 Guitar – Mark Sheridan (tracks: 1, 3, 4 to 6, 9, 10)
 Keyboards – Jonathan Quarmby (tracks: 1 to 10)
 Strings – The London Metropolitan Orchestra (tracks: 1 to 9)

Charts

References

2003 albums
Des'ree albums
albums produced by Kevin Bacon (producer)
albums produced by Jonathan Quarmby
Epic Records albums